Kehillat Israel is a Reconstructionist congregation in Pacific Palisades, Los Angeles. They are one of two Reconstructionist synagogues in greater Los Angeles (the other being the Malibu Jewish Center and Synagogue). Their senior rabbi is Amy Bernstein.

History
Prominent current and former attendees include:
Lloyd Braun, former Chairman of the ABC Entertainment Group
Alden Ehrenreich, actor 
Jon Feltheimer, CEO of Lions Gate Entertainment
Ellie Kanner, director
Bob Saget
Adam Sandler
John Whitesell, director

References

Pacific Palisades, Los Angeles
Reconstructionist synagogues in the United States
Synagogues in Los Angeles